"There's a Gold Mine in the Sky" is a popular song first published in 1937. The music was written by Charles Kenny and Nick Kenny. It charted at #1 on the "Sheet-Music Leaders" Chart in Billboard Magazine issued February 12, 1938, for the week ending February 5, 1938.  

Artists that have recorded this song include Gene Autry (OKeh 03358), Jimmie Davis (Decca 5473), Pat Boone (Dot 15602), Art Kassel (Bluebird B-7257), Johnny Pfander (Damon D-12223), Bing Crosby (Decca 2678) (see Cowboy Songs (Bing Crosby album)), and Kate Smith.

References 

1937 songs
American songs